The Roman Catholic  Diocese of San Andrés Tuxtla (erected 23 May 1959) is a suffragan diocese of the Archdiocese of Jalapa. In 1962, it lost territory to form the Archdiocese of Jalapa and the Diocese of Veracruz. It also lost territory in 1984 with the formation of the Diocese of Coatzacoalcos.

Bishops

Ordinaries
Jesús Villareal y Fierro (1959-1965) 
Arturo Antonio Szymanski Ramírez (1965-1968), appointed Bishop of Tampico, Tamaulipas
Guillermo Ranzahuer González (1969-2004) 
José Trinidad Zapata Ortiz (2004-2014), appointed Bishop of Papantla, Puebla
Fidencio López Plaza (2015-2020), appointed Bishop of Querétaro, Querétaro.
José Luis Canto Sosa (2021-present)

Coadjutor bishop
Arturo Antonio Szymanski Ramírez (1960-1965)

External links and references

San Andres Tuxtla
Los Tuxtlas
San Andres Tuxtla, Roman Catholic Diocese of
San Andres Tuxtla
San Andres Tuxtla